Knottenbelt is a surname. It may refer to:
Josef Knottenbelt (1910–1998), Dutch tennis player
Marianna Knottenbelt (born 1949), Dutch-Canadian photographer, architect and real-estate developer.
Martin Knottenbelt (1920–2004), Dutch commando and anti-war activist